Résistance was a 48-gun  of the French Navy.  captured her in 1797 and the Royal Navy took her into service as HMS Fisgard. She was sold in 1814.

French career 
The French Navy ordered her on 8 March 1793 as Fidélité, but she was renamed Résistance while still on the stocks. In 1797 she served as a troop ship, ferrying the Légion Noire to Cardigan Bay during the Battle of Fishguard.

British career 
The Royal Navy took Résistance into service as the first HMS Fisgard, naming her after the town of Fishguard because of her role in the battle. On 20 October 1798 she captured .

On 3 April 1800, Fisgard recaptured the United States letter of marque Minerva, which the French privateer Minerve had captured three days earlier.

Between the 20th of July and 2 August 1800, Captain T.B. Martin and Fisgard captured four vessels:

St. John Baptiste, a Spanish lugger, that she burnt:
 a French privateer of 16 guns and 141 men. Gironde had been a particularly successful and active vessel. She had on board 53 English prisoners, the masters and crews of four vessels that she had captured;
Alerte, a French privateer of 14 guns and 84 men. She was only six days out of Bordeaux and had been sent out to intercept the homeward bound West India convoy; and 
Joseph, an English South Seas whaler that had been a prize to the French privateer Minerve.

The three unburnt vessels arrived at Plymouth on 14 August. The four vessels Gironde had captured were:

Swan sloop, Andrew Miller, master, from Oporto and carrying wine;
Countess of Lauderdale, Thomas Bennett, master, from Demerary, carrying sugar and cotton;
Active brig, Benjamin Tucker, master, from Bermuda, carrying sugar and cotton; and
Young William, Charles Bacon, master, returning from the South Sea's with a cargo of (whale) oil.

On 30 September Fisgard captured the Spanish naval brig , of fourteen 18-pounder carronades and with a crew of 100 men. She was two days out of Ferrol and carrying dispatches and orders to America. She threw the dispatches, etc., overboard during the chase.

On 15 May 1801 Fisgard, and the hired armed cutters Hirondelle and Earl Spencer, recaptured the brig Victory from the French. Then on 7 July Fisgard was at Plymouth when the gun-vessel  ran aground under the Royal Citadel, Plymouth. Fisgard sent her boats to assist and the crew and some of the stores were saved, but the vessel herself was a wreck.

In December 1804 Fisgard was at  when she captured the French letter of marque Tigre. Tigre was pierced for 16 guns and had 14 mounted: twelve 18-pounder carronades and two brass 4-pounder guns; she also had six 4-pounders in her hold. She had a crew of 40 men, and was ballasted with mahogany and die wood. She was 45 days into her voyage from Cayenne to Cadiz and on her way she had captured an English brig that had been sailing from London to Saint Michaels; the brig's master and crew were aboard Tigre. Tigre was the former , of Liverpool. (Angola was a slave ship that had made four voyages carrying slaves from West Africa to the West Indies. The French had captured her in 1804 on her fifth voyage.)

Ceres was declared a total loss on her arrival at Barbadoes from London.

On 18 August 1806 Fisgards boats went into Samaná Bay and there recaptured a British vessel that a French privateer of four guns and 100 men had captured on 7 August off Salt Island. The British vessel was Three Brothers, White, master, which had been sailing from Bermuda to St Thomas's and Honduras.

Fate
The Principal Officers and Commissioners of the Royal Navy offered "Fisgard, of 38 guns and 1182 tons", lying at Portsmouth, for sale on 11 August 1814. The buyer had to post a bond of £3,000, with two guarantors, that the buyers would break up the vessel within a year of purchase.

Notes

Citations

References

External links
 

1795 ships
Age of Sail frigates of France
Vengeance-class frigates
Captured ships
Ships built in France
Maritime incidents in 1797
Frigates of the Royal Navy
Maritime incidents in 1805